Gonzalo Martinez Caicedo (born 30 November 1975) is a Colombian football defender. At club level, he played for Patriotas.

Club career
Martínez was born in Candelaria, Valle del Cauca. He started his professional career in the Colombian First Division with Deportes Tolima in 1998 before moving to Italian Serie A side Udinese in 2001. Martinez made 24 appearances for Udinese from 2001 to 2003 before joining Napoli on loan, where he spent part of the 2002–03 campaign. Half of the registration rights was also signed by A.C. Venezia in January 2003 by exchanged with Rubén Maldonado. In the 2003–04 season, he moved to Reggina with Andrea Sottil and David Di Michele, where he made 14 appearances.

The Colombian defender returned to his native Colombia and rejoined Deportes Tolima for the 2005 season, notching three goals in 21 appearances. Martìnez then moved to Olimpia, and later, Paraguayan side Libertad, during the 2005–06 season, where he started in a combined 27 games and helped Libertad capture the Paraguayan First Division championship. In 2007, Martìnez returned to Colombia and appeared in 36 games for Millonarios.

In early 2008, he moved to D.C. United, where he started initially at center back, then left back, before falling out of favor with the coaching staff.  After 1 goal and 2 assists in 22 starts with United, Martinez returned to Colombia to play for Atlético Huila.

International career
Martinez has represented Colombia 36 times at the international level. He participated in the qualifiers for the 2002 FIFA World Cup in Korea and Japan, and also the qualifiers for the 2006 FIFA World Cup in Germany. He also represented his country at the 2003 FIFA Confederations Cup and 2004 Copa América.

Honors

D.C. United
Lamar Hunt U.S. Open Cup (1): 2008

External links

1975 births
Living people
Sportspeople from Valle del Cauca Department
Colombian footballers
Colombia international footballers
2000 CONCACAF Gold Cup players
2003 FIFA Confederations Cup players
2004 Copa América players
Deportes Tolima footballers
Udinese Calcio players
S.S.C. Napoli players
Reggina 1914 players
Club Olimpia footballers
Club Libertad footballers
Millonarios F.C. players
D.C. United players
Atlético Huila footballers
Deportivo Cali footballers
Real Cartagena footballers
Patriotas Boyacá footballers
Colombian expatriate footballers
Expatriate footballers in Italy
Expatriate footballers in Paraguay
Expatriate soccer players in the United States
Categoría Primera A players
Serie A players
Serie B players
Paraguayan Primera División players
Major League Soccer players
Association football defenders